Kitchen sink may refer to:

 Freaks of Nature (film), a 2015 comedy horror film, also known as Kitchen Sink
 Kitchen Sink, a 1989 horror short directed by Alison Maclean
 Kitchen Sink (TV series), cookery series on Food Network
 "Kitchen Sink", a song by Twenty One Pilots from their album Regional at Best
 Kitchen Sink (album), an album by Nadine Shah, 2020
 Kitchen Sink Press, an independent comic book publisher
 Kitchen sink realism, a British cultural movement in the late 1950s and early 1960s
 Kitchen sink syndrome, also known as "scope creep" in project management
 Kitchen sink regression, a usually pejorative term for a regression analysis which uses a long list of possible independent variables
 A sink in a kitchen for washing dishes, vegetables, etc.